Bugs' White Water Rapids is a flume ride located in the Spassburg section at Six Flags Fiesta Texas in San Antonio, Texas, since 1998.

General information

Bugs' White Water Rapids has two lift hills and two drops. The ride is the longest operating water ride in the park each season, operating from opening day through Fright Fest and Holiday in the Park. During Holiday in the Park, the ride is closed, as the queue building is transformed into "Santa's Castle" until Christmas. It then opens back up until the end of the season.

The ride was manufactured by Hopkins Rides and constructed by Martin & Vleminckx.

Ride
Once riders get on Bugs' White Water Rapids, the flume takes a right coming out of the station where the ride begins traveling towards the first lift hill. After the small first drop, then flume makes an almost complete circle to the right, and then takes you up to the second tallest section of the ride. Once at the second highest part of the ride, you dip down and curve through turns, back and forth along KIDZOPOLIS and over the ride below it. Once at the top, you go straight down to the water with a big splash. After the big drop, the boat will travel through more turns until it reaches back to the station, and then riders can depart.

Theme
Bugs' White Water Rapids is themed to the famous Looney Tunes character Bugs Bunny and also Yosemite Sam. While riding the flume it tales the story of the Academy Award winner, 1958 Looney Tunes cartoon Knighty Knight Bugs by the ride Medieval scenery. The station of the ride and the queue is located inside the "Black Knight's Castle" Where guest experience the antics of Bugs Bunny, the court jester, as he is commissioned to use his wits and reclaim the Singing Sword.

See also
 Hopkins Rides
 Knighty Knight Bugs

References

External links 
 Bugs' White Water Rapids at the Six Flags Fiesta Texas Official Website

Amusement rides introduced in 1998
Six Flags Fiesta Texas
Water rides
Water rides manufactured by Hopkins Rides
Six Flags attractions